Copidognathus longispinus is a species of mite in the Halacaridae family. The scientific name of this species was first published in 1985 by Bartsch & Iliffe.

References

Trombidiformes
Animals described in 1985